Olive Mercer (15 September 1905 – 2 January 1983), born Olive Maude Adams, was a British television actress perhaps best known for playing the wife of Maurice Yeatman, the Verger in Dad's Army.

Born in 1905 in Hendon in Middlesex, she was the daughter of Henry James Adams (born 1875), a theatre ticket agent, and Fanny Maria (née Dunnett, 1875-1961). In 1931 she married Charles Harry Mercer; they remained married until her death.

She often played stern older women in situation comedies, including On the Buses, Billy Liar and Whatever Happened to the Likely Lads?. She also appeared in The Ronnie Barker Yearbook (1971) but is best known for playing Mrs. Beryl Yeatman, the wife of Maurice Yeatman, the Verger, in Dad's Army.

Olive Mercer died in Hillingdon in Middlesex in 1983.

References

Filmography
A Clockwork Orange (1971) - Old Lady at Duke of York (uncredited)
Sex and the Other Woman (1972) - Cleaner

External links
 
photo

British television actresses
1905 births
1983 deaths
20th-century British actresses
People from Hendon